Brit Heyworth Marling (born August 7, 1982) is an American actress and screenwriter. She rose to prominence after starring in several films that premiered at the Sundance Film Festival, including Sound of My Voice (2011), Another Earth (2011), and The East (2013), each of which she co-wrote in addition to playing the lead role. She co-created, wrote, and starred in the Netflix series The OA, which debuted in 2016.

Early life and education
Marling was born in Chicago, Illinois, the daughter of property developer parents John and Heidi Marling. She was named "Brit" after her Norwegian maternal great-grandmother. She has a sister, Morgan. Marling grew up in Winnetka, Illinois, and Orlando, Florida, where she attended the arts program at Dr. Phillips High School. Marling was interested in acting, but her parents encouraged her to focus on academics. She graduated from Georgetown University in 2005 with degrees in economics and studio art, and was her class valedictorian.

Career
At Georgetown, Marling met her long-time collaborators, future directors Mike Cahill and Zal Batmanglij. Marling spent the summer of her junior year interning for the investment banking firm Goldman Sachs as an investment analyst. She felt a life spent there would have a lack of meaning and eventually turned down a job offer from the firm, opting instead to move to Cuba with Cahill to film the documentary Boxers and Ballerinas. Co-writing the documentary with Cahill and Nick  Shumaker, and co-directing with Cahill, the film helped Marling gain recognition in 2004.

In 2005, Marling moved with Cahill and Batmanglij to Los Angeles. She attended auditions and was offered roles in horror films, but turned them down. She stated she "wanted to be able to cast herself in roles that wouldn't require her to play the typical parts offered to young actresses, the perfunctory girlfriend or a crime victim." She was discovered by talent agent Hylda Queally. 

In the summer of 2009, she joined a group of freegans with friend and co-worker Zal Batmanglij, living in tents and retrieving food from dumpsters, to explore how other young people were constructing a meaningful life.

Marling co-wrote, co-produced, and acted in the 2011 films Sound of My Voice and Another Earth, directed by Batmanglij and Cahill, respectively. Both of these films were featured at the 2011 Sundance Film Festival, with Another Earth winning the Alfred P. Sloan Prize for outstanding film with science, technology or math as a major theme. In 2012, she played the daughter of Richard Gere's character in Arbitrage.

In 2013, she collaborated with Searchlight on the film The East, where she also played a leading role. Directed by Zal Batmanglij and co-written by Marling and Batmanglij, The East is based on the duo's experience as freegans and their concern with the side effects of prescription drugs.

Marling and Batmanglij collaborated to create the drama series The OA which debuted in 2016 on Netflix. It was written by Marling and Batmanglij, who produced the series along with Dede Gardner and Jeremy Kleiner of Plan B, and Michael Sugar of Anonymous Content.

Marling started filming for the second season of The OA in January 2018. The second season, entitled "Part II", was released on March 22, 2019, and received positive reviews.

Despite having many roles in films she has co-written, Marling stated she "get[s] a lot more pleasure in acting in other people's stories" since "one of the great pleasures of acting is surrendering to someone else's point of view of the world."

Filmography

Film

Television

References

External links

 
 Interview with Brit Marling about 'Another Earth'

1982 births
21st-century American actresses
Actresses from Chicago
Actresses from Orlando, Florida
American documentary filmmakers
American film actresses
Film producers from Illinois
American people of Norwegian descent
American women screenwriters
Georgetown University alumni
Goldman Sachs people
Living people
Writers from Chicago
Writers from Orlando, Florida
American television actresses
Dr. Phillips High School alumni
Screenwriters from Illinois
Screenwriters from Florida
Film producers from Florida
American women documentary filmmakers